Brandy City, formerly known as Strychnine City, is an unincorporated community in Sierra County, California, United States,  west of Goodyears Bar.

The settlement is on Cherokee Creek, a tributary of the North Fork of the Yuba River. Gold was discovered there in 1850 and mined in the 19th century and again in the 1920s. There was a school, and until 1926 a post office.

See also
California Gold Rush
List of ghost towns in California

References

Unincorporated communities in Sierra County, California
Ghost towns in California
History of Sierra County, California
Unincorporated communities in California